This list of mountains and hills of Hesse contains a selection of the significant mountain and hills located in the German federal state of Hesse sorted in each case by their height in metres above sea level (Normalhöhennull or NHN).

Highest mountains in Hesse’s provinces 
The following table shows the highest mountain in each of the three Hessian provinces or Regierungsbezirke.

Clicking on the word "List" in the Lists column, takes you to a list of other mountains and hills in the selected region (some of which extend beyond the borders of Hesse). The table is sorted by height, but may be resorted by clicking on the symbol in the appropriate column header.

Highest mountains and hills in Hesse’s landscapes and natural regions 
The following table lists the highest mountains and hills of the various Hessian landscape and natural regions.

In the Landscape column the major Central Upland ranges and landscapes are listed in  bold; the smaller, local subranges or basins (with prominent island-like hills) are listed in italics. Clicking on the word “List” in the Lists column, takes you to a list of other mountains and hills in the respective landscape or region. By clicking on MU in the column you will be taken to the article on the natural regional Major unit to which the landscape belongs.

The table is sorted by height but may be resorted by clicking on the symbols in the relevant column header.

Mountains and hills across the whole of Hesse 
Name, Height, Location (district/county, landscape/region)
 Wasserkuppe (950.0 m), county of Fulda, Rhön; highest mountain in the Rhön and in Hesse
 Dammersfeldkuppe (927.9 m), Hessian/Bavarian border, Rhön
 Heidelstein (925.7 m), Hessian/Bavarian border, Rhön
 Eierhauckberg (909.9 m), Hessian/Bavarian border, Rhön
 Abtsrodaer Kuppe (904.8 m), county of Fulda, Rhön
 Stirnberg (901.9 m), Hessian/Bavarian border, Rhön
 Hohe Hölle (893.8 m), Hessian/Bavarian border, Rhön
 Steinkopf (888 m), border Hesse/Bavarian, Rhön
 Himmeldunkberg (887.9 m), Hessian/Bavarian border, Rhön
 Großer Feldberg (881.5 m), Hochtaunuskreis, Taunus; highest mountain of South Hesse
 Mittelberg (880 m), Hessian/Bavarian border, Rhön
 Pferdskopf (874.9 m), county of Fulda, Rhön
 Beilstein (864.6 m), Hessian/Bavarian border, Rhön
 Schachen (857.0 m), Hessian/Bavarian border, Rhön
 Reesberg (851.2 m), county of Fulda, Rhön
 Rommerser Berg (850.2 m), county of Fulda, Rhön
 Ottilienstein (846.4 m), county of Fulda, Rhön
 Rabenstein (845.0 m), border Hesse/Bavarian, Rhön
 Langenberg (843.2 m), Hessian/North Rhine-Westphalian border, Rothaar Mountains, Upland; highest mountain in North Hesse and Northwest Germany (outside of the Harz)
 Hegekopf (842.9 m), Waldeck-Frankenberg, Rothaar Mountains, Upland
  (842.7 m), county of Fulda, Rhön
 Ettelsberg (837.7 m), Waldeck-Frankenberg, Rothaar Mountains, Upland
 Milseburg (835.2 m), county of Fulda, Rhön
 Mathesberg (831.8 m), county of Fulda, Rhön
 Schafstein (831.8 m), county of Fulda, Rhön
 Hopperkopf (832.3 m), Hessian/North Rhine-Westphalian border, Rothaar Mountains, Upland
 Kleiner Feldberg (825.2 m), Hochtaunuskreis, Taunus
 Ottersteine (821.3 m), county of Fulda, Rhön
 Eubeberg (820 m), county of Fulda, Rhön
  (816.5 m), county of Fulda, Rhön
 Feldberg (815.2 m), county of Fulda, Rhön
 Mühlenkopf (815 m), Waldeck-Frankenberg, Rothaar Mountains, Upland
 Hoher Eimberg (806.1 m), Hessian/North Rhine-Westphalian border, Rothaar Mountains, Upland
  (805.0 m), Hessian/North Rhine-Westphalian border, Rothaar Mountains, Upland
  (800.6 m), county of Fulda, Rhön
 Kesselstein (800 m), county of Fulda, Rhön
 Mittelsberg (801 m), Waldeck-Frankenberg, Rothaar Mountains, Upland
 Altkönig (798.2 m, hillfort), Hochtaunuskreis, Taunus
 Hohe Pön (792.7 m), Waldeck-Frankenberg, Rothaar Mountains, Upland
  (786 m), county of Fulda, Rhön
 Kutenberg (785 m), Hessian/North Rhine-Westphalian border, Rothaar Mountains, Upland
 Dreiskopf (781 m), Hessian/North Rhine-Westphalian border, Rothaar Mountains, Upland
  (775.3 m), Hessian/North Rhine-Westphalian border, Rothaar Mountains, Upland
 Taufstein (773.0 m), Vogelsbergkreis, Vogelsberg; highest mountain in Middle Hesse
 Dungberg (772.7 m), Hessian/Thuringian border, Rhön
 Großer Nallenberg (768.3 m), county of Fulda, Rhön
 Hoherodskopf (764 m), Vogelsbergkreis, Vogelsberg
 Auersberg (757 m), county of Fulda, Rhön
 Kasseler Kuppe (753.6 m), Werra-Meißner-Kreis, Hoher Meißner; highest mountain of Northeast Hesse
 Sieben Ahorn (753 m), Vogelsbergkreis, Vogelsberg
 Kasseler Stein (748 m), Werra-Meißner-Kreis, Hoher Meißner
 Buchschirm (746 m), county of Fulda, Rhön
 Emmet (742.5 m), Waldeck-Frankenberg, Rothaar Mountains, Upland
 Auf’m Knoll (738 m), Waldeck-Frankenberg, Rothaar Mountains, Upland
 Dommel (738.0 m), Waldeck-Frankenberg, Rothaar Mountains, Upland
 Musenberg (738 m), Waldeck-Frankenberg
 Herchenhainer Höhe (733 m), Vogelsbergkreis, Vogelsberg
 Stellberg (727 m), county of Fulda, Rhön
 Schneeberg (726.3 m), Waldeck-Frankenberg, Rothaar Mountains, Upland
 Sähre (726 m), Waldeck-Frankenberg, Rothaar Mountains, Upland
 Iberg (720.5 m), Waldeck-Frankenberg, Rothaar Mountains, Upland
 Geiselstein (720 m), Vogelsbergkreis, Vogelsberg
 Kalbe (720 m), Werra-Meißner-Kreis, Hoher Meißner
 Nesselberg (716 m), Vogelsbergkreis, Vogelsberg
 Koppen (715.1 m), Waldeck-Frankenberg, Rothaar Mountains, Upland
 Osterkopf (708.5 m), Waldeck-Frankenberg, Rothaar Mountains, Upland
 Maulkuppe (706 m), county of Fulda, Rhön
 Wachtküppel (705 m), "Spitzbub", county of Fulda, Rhön
 Kleiner Nallenberg (704.1 m), county of Fulda, Rhön
 Orenberg (702.0 m), Waldeck-Frankenberg, Rothaar Mountains, Upland
 Weilsberg (700.7 m), Hochtaunuskreis, Taunus
 Gebrannter Rücken (698 m), Waldeck-Frankenberg, Rothaar Mountains, near Battenberg
 Ebersberg (689 m), county of Fulda, Rhön
 Glaskopf (686.8 m), Hochtaunuskreis, Taunus
 Kolbenberg (684.0 m), Hochtaunuskreis, Taunus
 Klingenkopf (682.7 m), Hochtaunuskreis, Taunus
 Dillenberg (682.4 m), Hochtaunuskreis, Taunus
 Wüstegarten (675.3 m), Schwalm-Eder-Kreis/Waldeck-Frankenberg, Kellerwald
 Lippestriesch (674.6 m), Waldeck-Frankenberg, near Bromskirchen
 Sackpfeife (673.5 m), Waldeck-Frankenberg/Marburg-Biedenkopf, Rothaar Mountains/Lahn-Dill Uplands
 Tannenfels (669 m), county of Fulda, Rhön
 Bilstein (Vogelsberg) (666 m), Vogelsbergkreis, Vogelsberg
 Sängelberg (665.0 m), Hochtaunuskreis, Taunus
 Gackerstein (663 m), Vogelsbergkreis, Vogelsberg
 Pferdskopf (662.6 m), Hochtaunuskreis, Taunus
 Weißeberg (660.2 m), Hochtaunuskreis, Taunus
 Hohes Lohr (656.7 m), Waldeck-Frankenberg, Kellerwald
 Steinwand (646 m), county of Fulda, Rhön
 Hohe Warte (644.8 m), Waldeck-Frankenberg, Rothaar Mountains
 Hirschberg (Kaufungen Forest) (643.4 m), Werra-Meißner-Kreis, Kaufungen Forest/Söhre
 Buchholz (643 m), Waldeck-Frankenberg, Hatzfeld Forest
 Buchholz (643 m), Waldeck-Frankenberg, Hatzfeld Forest
 Höllberg (642.8 m), Lahn-Dill-Kreis, Westerwald; highest mountain in the Hessian part of the Westerwald
 Bilstein (Kaufungen Forest) (641.2 m), Werra-Meißner-Kreis, Kaufungen Forest
 Roßkopf (max. 640 m), Hochtaunuskreis, Taunus
 Große Aschkoppe (639.8 m), Waldeck-Frankenberg, Kellerwald
 Krimmelberg (639.7 m), Hochtaunuskreis, Taunus
 Hühnerberg (Taunus) (636.0 m), Rheingau-Taunus-Kreis, Taunus
 Junkernberg (636.0 m), Hochtaunuskreis, Taunus
 Hunsrück (635.9 m), Schwalm-Eder-Kreis, Kellerwald
 Eisenberg (Knüll) (635.5 m), Hersfeld-Rotenburg, Knüll
 Knüllköpfchen (634 m), Schwalm-Eder-Kreis, Knüll
 Fauleberg (633.4 m), Hochtaunuskreis, Taunus
 Großer Eichwald (633.2 m), Hochtaunuskreis, Taunus
 Hainpracht (631 m), Waldeck-Frankenberg, Hatzfeld Forest
 Soisberg (630 m), county of Fulda/Hersfeld-Rotenburg, Kuppenrhön, Rhön
 Traddelkopf (626.4 m), Waldeck-Frankenberg, Kellerwald
 Hassenroth (622 m), Marburg-Biedenkopf, Rothaar Mountains
 Eichkopf (Dornholzhausen) (620.2 m), Hochtaunuskreis, Taunus
 Hauberg (619 m), Vogelsbergkreis, Vogelsberg
 Kalte Herberge (619.3 m), Rheingau-Taunus-Kreis, Taunus
 Bremer Berg (618.9 m), Hochtaunuskreis, Taunus
 Auf der Baar (618 m), Lahn-Dill-Kreis, Westerwald
 Hohe Wurzel (617.9 m), Rheingau-Taunus-Kreis, Taunus
 Winterberg (616.6 m), Waldeck-Frankenberg, Kellerwald
 Hollerkopf (615.5 m), Hochtaunuskreis, Taunus
 Hohes Gras (614.8 m), city of Kassel, Habichtswald Uplands
 Bartenstein (614 m), Lahn-Dill-Kreis, Westerwald
 Judenkopf (613.8 m), Hochtaunuskreis, Taunus
 Auenberg (610.7 m), Waldeck-Frankenberg, Kellerwald
 Angelburg (609.4 m), Lahn-Dill-Kreis, Schelderwald/Gladenbach Uplands
 Bubenberg (609 m), Waldeck-Frankenberg, Rothaar Mountains, near Hatzfeld
 Uhlenstein (607.5 m), county of Kassel, Habichtswald Uplands
 Mühlenstein (607.2 m), Werra-Meißner-Kreis, Kaufungen Forest
 Einsiedler (606.6 m), Hochtaunuskreis, Taunus
 Knoten (605.4 m), Lahn-Dill-Kreis, Westerwald
 Neunkircher Höhe (605.0 m), Kreis Bergstraße, Odenwald; highest hill in the Hessian part of the Odenwald
 Hohe Egge (604.9), Waldeck-Frankenberg, Rothaar Mountains
 Dicker Kopf (603.7 m), Waldeck-Frankenberg, Kellerwald
 Großer Bärenberg (600.7 m), county of Kassel, Habichtswald Uplands
 Essigberg (Hoher Habichtswald; 597.5 m), county of Kassel, Habichtswald Uplands
 Klingenberg (597.5 m), Hochtaunuskreis, Taunus
 Großer Steinhaufen (597.0 m), city of Kassel, Habichtswald Uplands
 Pfaffenrod (596.2 m), Hochtaunuskreis, Taunus
 Frauenstein (596 m), county of Fulda, Landrücken
 Feldkopf (596.0 m), Hochtaunuskreis, Taunus
 Hardberg (Odenwald) (593 m), Kreis Bergstraße, Odenwald
 Köpfchen (593 m), Schwalm-Eder-Kreis, Knüll
 Hohe Kanzel (591.8 m), Rheingau-Taunus-Kreis, Taunus
 Rimberg (591.8 m), Hersfeld-Rotenburg, Knüll
 Herzberg (591.4 m), Hochtaunuskreis, Taunus
 Giebelrain (590 m), county of Fulda, Rhön
 Schmittgrund (590 m), Lahn-Dill-Kreis, Schelderwald
 Stiefelhöhe (589 m), border Hesse/Baden-Württemberg, Odenwald
 Eschenburg (589 m), Lahn-Dill-Kreis, Lahn-Dill Uplands, western Schelderwald
 Görzberg (588 m), Marburg-Biedenkopf, Rothaar Mountains, westlich Gemeinde Wiesenbach
 Hohlstein (587.8 m), Waldeck-Frankenberg, Kellerwald
 Pfaffenkopf (586.9 m), Hochtaunuskreis, Taunus
 Jeust (585.0 m), Schwalm-Eder-Kreis/Waldeck-Frankenberg, Kellerwald
 Steinberg (585 m), Werra-Meißner-Kreis, Kaufungen Forest
 Sauklippe (584.4 m), Schwalm-Eder-Kreis, Kellerwald
 Eisberg (583.0 m), Werra-Meißner-Kreis, Stölzinger Hills
 Biemerberg (582.2 m), Hochtaunuskreis, Taunus
 Bilsenkopf (582 m), Waldeck-Frankenberg, Kellerwald
 Hallgarter Zange (580.5 m), Rheingau-Taunus-Kreis, Taunus
 Haferberg (580.4 m), Werra-Meißner-Kreis/Göttingen, Kaufungen Forest
 Erbacher Kopf (579.8 m), Rheingau-Taunus-Kreis, Taunus
 Kalteiche (579.3 m), Lahn-Dill-Kreis, Westerwald
 Hoher Dörnberg (578.7 m), county of Kassel, Habichtswald Uplands
 Tromm (577 m), Kreis Bergstraße, Odenwald
 Krehberg (576 m), Kreis Bergstraße, Odenwald
 Ahrensberg (570 m), county of Kassel, Habichtswald Uplands
 Steinkopf (569.8 m), Hochtaunuskreis, Taunus
 Hohestein (569.0 m), Werra-Meißner-Kreis, Gobert
 Hohestein (569 m), Werra-Meißner-Kreis, near Bad-Sooden-Allendorf
 Großer Gudenberg (568.7 m), county of Kassel, Habichtswald Uplands
 Hermannskoppe (567.1 m), border Hesse/Bavarian, Spessart; highest hill in the Hessian part of the Spessart
 Talgang (566.1 m), Waldeck-Frankenberg, Kellerwald
 Langenberg (565.0 m), Werra-Meißner-Kreis, Kaufungen Forest
 Ziegenkopf (564.7 m), city of Kassel, Habichtswald Uplands
 Würgeloh (563.9 m), Marburg-Biedenkopf, Schelderwald, Bottenhorn Plateau
 Himmelsberg (563.7 m), Schwalm-Eder-Kreis, Günsteröder Höhe, Melsung Uplands
 Eichkopf (Ruppertshain) (563.3 m), Hochtaunuskreis, im Taunus
 Pentersrück (562.2 m), Schwalm-Eder-Kreis, Günsteröder Höhe, Melsung Uplands
 Eisenberg (Korbach) (562 m), Waldeck-Frankenberg, Rothaar Mountains
 Rahnsberg (561 m), Rothaar
 Johannisköppe (557 m), Waldeck-Frankenberg, Rothaar Mountains/Lahn-Dill Uplands
 Schwengeberg (556.7 m), Schwalm-Eder-Kreis, Habichtswald Uplands
 Naxburg (553 m), Vogelsbergkreis, Vogelsberg
 Stallberg (Rhön) (553 m), county of Fulda, Kuppenrhön, Rhön
 Daubhaus (552 m), Marburg-Biedenkopf, eastern Bottenhorn Plateau
 Horst (552 m), Vogelsbergkreis, Vogelsberg
 Tiefenrother Höhe (551 m), Lahn-Dill-Kreis, Westerwald
 Alheimer (548.7 m), Hersfeld-Rotenburg, Stölzinger Hills
 Mappershainer Kopf (548.0 m), Rheingau-Taunus-Kreis, Taunus
 Spessartskopf (547 m), Kreis Bergstraße, Odenwald
 Falkenberg (546 m), Odenwaldkreis, Odenwald
 Wolfsküppel (545.1 m), Hochtaunuskreis, Taunus
 Kaulenberg (545 m), county of Kassel, Habichtswald Uplands
 Grauer Kopf (543.4 m), Hesse/Rhineland-Palatinate border, Rheingau-Taunus-Kreis/Rhein-Lahn-Kreis, Taunus
 Ochsenwurzelskopf (542.2 m), Waldeck-Frankenberg, Kellerwald
 Kleiner Steinberg (541.9 m), county of Göttingen, Kaufungen Forest
 Großer Steinberg (541.8 m), county of Göttingen, Kaufungen Forest
 Horst (540 m), Main-Kinzig-Kreis, Spessart
 Hohekopf (539.4 m), Werra-Meißner-Kreis, Rommerode Hill Country
 Rassel (539.4 m), Wiesbaden, Taunus
 Ermerod (539.2 m), Waldeck-Frankenberg, Kellerwald
 Waldskopf (538 m), Kreis Bergstraße, Odenwald
 Alte Höhe (536 m), Vogelsbergkreis, Vogelsberg
 Rohrberg (535.6 m), Werra-Meißner-Kreis, Kaufungen Forest/Söhre
 Elfbuchen (535 m), city of Kassel, Habichtswald Uplands
 Laufskopf (534.8 m), Schwalm-Eder-Kreis, Habichtswald Uplands, Habichtswald Uplands
 Wagenberg (535 m), Kreis Bergstraße, Odenwald
 Breiter Berg (533.2 m), Schwalm-Eder-Kreis, Werra-Meißner-Kreis, Melsung Uplands
 Nimerich (533 m), Kreis Marburg-Biedenkopf, Lahn-Dill Uplands
 Appelsberg (Rhön) (532 m), county of Fulda, Kuppenrhön, Rhön
 Steinbergskopf (532 m), counties of Göttingen and Werra-Meißner-Kreis, Kaufungen Forest
 Monte Kali (530 m), Hersfeld-Rotenburg, Seulingswald
 Flörsbacher Höhe (529 m), Main-Kinzig-Kreis, Spessart
 Bielstein (527.8 m), county of Kassel, Kaufungen Forest/Söhre
 Karlsberg (526.2 m), city of Kassel, Habichtswald Uplands
 Kuhbett (525.6 m), Limburg-Weilburg, Taunus
 Ohrberg (525.4 m), Waldeck-Frankenberg, Kellerwald
 Dreienberg (525 m), Hersfeld-Rotenburg, Kuppenrhön, Rhön
 Rückersberg (525 m), county of Fulda, Kuppenrhön, Rhön
 Stoppelsberg (524 m), Hersfeld-Rotenburg, Kuppenrhön, Rhön
 Isthaberg (523.1 m), county of Kassel, Habichtswald Uplands
 Kleinberg (522 m), county of Fulda, Kuppenrhön, Rhön
 Obere Waldspitze (521 m), border Hesse/Bavarian, Spessart
 Schwarzer Berg (521 m), Main-Kinzig-Kreis, Spessart
 Hesselberg (518 m), Wetteraukreis, Taunus
 Homberg (518.5 m), Waldeck-Frankenberg, Kellerwald
 Steinkopf (518.0 m), Hochtaunuskreis, Taunus
 Wieselsberg (518 m), county of Fulda, Kuppenrhön, Rhön
 Melibokus (Malschen) (517 m), Kreis Bergstraße, Odenwald
 Morsberg (517 m), Odenwaldkreis, Odenwald
 Markberg (516 m), Main-Kinzig-Kreis, Spessart
 Roßkopf (516 m), Hessian-Bavarian border, Spessart
 Rossert (515.9 m), Main-Taunus-Kreis, Taunus
 Großer Goldberg (515 m), Hessian-Bavarian border, Spessart
 Rabenkuppe (514.8 m), Werra-Meißner-Kreis, Ringgau
 Felsberg (514 m), Kreis Bergstraße, Odenwald
 Boyneburg (513.0 m), Werra-Meißner-Kreis, Ringgau
 Saukopf (511.4 m), county of Kassel, Habichtswald Uplands
 Landecker Berg (511 m), Hersfeld-Rotenburg, Kuppenrhön, Rhön
 Helfenstein/e (509.8 m), county of Kassel, Habichtswald Uplands
 Huttener Berg (508 m), Main-Kinzig-Kreis, Landrücken
 Atzelberg (506.7 m), Main-Taunus-Kreis, Taunus
 Peterskopf (506.6 m), Waldeck-Frankenberg, Kellerwald
 Hirschberg (Knüll) (506 m), Hersfeld-Rotenburg, Knüll
 Glasebach (505.8 m), Schwalm-Eder-Kreis, Osthessisches Bergland
 Exberg (505 m), Werra-Meißner-Kreis, Kaufungen Forest
 Hundskopf (Taunus) (503.8 m), Rheingau-Taunus-Kreis, Taunus
 Finstere Höhe (503.2 m), Schwalm-Eder-Kreis, Günsteröder Höhe, Melsung Uplands
 Hellberg (502 m), Vogelsbergkreis, Vogelsberg
 Hirzstein (502.0 m), city of Kassel, Habichtswald Uplands
 Katzenstirn (501 m), Schwalm-Eder-Kreis, Stölzinger Hills
 Schickeberg (500 m), Werra-Meißner-Kreis, Ringgau
 Burgberg (Schauenburg) (499.9 m), county of Kassel, Habichtswald Uplands
 Großer Belgerkopf (499.9 m), county of Kassel, Kaufungen Forest/Söhre
 Beilstein (499.5 m), Main-Kinzig-Kreis, Spessart
 Großer Lindenkopf (498.7 m), Hochtaunuskreis, Taunus
 Dünsberg (497.7 m), county of Gießen, near Biebertal-Fellingshausen and Königsberg
 Rimberg (497.1 m), Marburg-Biedenkopf, Lahn-Dill Uplands
 Hübelsberg (497 m), county of Fulda, Kuppenrhön, Rhön
 Stellberg (495 m), county of Kassel, Söhre
 Almusküppel (494.5 m), county of Fulda, Landrücken
 Salmsbachskopf (493.2 m), Schwalm-Eder-Kreis, Melsung Uplands
 Weidelsberg (492.3 m), county of Kassel, Habichtswald Uplands, Langer Wald
 Buchswaldkopf (492 m), Rheingau-Taunuskreis, Taunus
 Goldgrube (492.0 m), Hochtaunuskreis, Taunus
 Nöll (492 m), Schwalm-Eder-Kreis, Knüll Hills
 Kleiner Belgerkopf (490 m), county of Kassel, Kaufungen Forest
 Schieferstein (488.2 m), Werra-Meißner-Kreis, Ringgau
 Lindenberg (485.9 m), county of Kassel, Habichtswald Uplands
 Hausberg (485.7 m), Wetteraukreis, Taunus
 Rippberg (485 m), county of Fulda, Rhön
 Michelskopf (485 m), county of Kassel, Kaufungen Forest/Söhre
 Winterstein (482.3 m), Hochtaunuskreis, Taunus
 Buchberg (482 m), county of Kassel, Kaufungen Forest
 Maisel (482.2 m), Hochtaunuskreis, Taunus
 Kleiner Dörnberg (481.6 m), county of Kassel, Habichtswald Uplands
 Toter Mann (480.3 m), Hersfeld-Rotenburg, Seulingswald
 Trieschkopf (480.1 m), county of Kassel, Söhre
 Bleibeskopf (480 m), Hochtaunuskreis, Taunus
 Burghasunger Berg (479.7 m), county of Kassel, Habichtswald Uplands
 Herzberg (478 m), Hersfeld-Rotenburg, Richelsdorf Hills
 Hundsrück (477.5 m), Werra-Meißner-Kreis, Schlierbachswald
 Hohlestein (476.6 m), county of Kassel, Habichtswald Uplands
 Niedensteiner Kopf (475.0 m), Schwalm-Eder-Kreis, Habichtswald Uplands
 Stirn (475 m), Waldeck-Frankenberg, Langer Wald
 Mengshäuser Kuppe (473 m), Hersfeld-Rotenburg, Fulda-Haune Tableland
 Staufenberg (472.2 m), county of Kassel, Reinhardswald
 Gahrenberg (472.1 m), county of Kassel, Reinhardswald
 Bechtelsberg (472 m), Schwalm-Eder-Kreis/Vogelsbergkreis,
 Tanzplatz (472 m), Waldeck-Frankenberg, Langer Wald
 Gickelsburg (470.9 m), Hochtaunuskreis, Taunus
 Hundskopf (Hemberg) (470.6 m), Schwalm-Eder-Kreis, Kellerwald/Oberhessische Schwelle
 Essigberg (Elmshagen) (Langenberge; ca. 470 m), county of Kassel/Schwalm-Eder-Kreis, Habichtswald Uplands
 Heitzelberg (467 m), Waldeck-Frankenberg, Langer Wald
 Mühlberg (467 m), Hersfeld-Rotenburg, Richelsdorf Hills
 Wildsberg (466.9 m), Schwalm-Eder-Kreis, Melsung Uplands
 Morsberg (466 m), county of Fulda, Kuppenrhön, Rhön
 Struth (466 m), Hersfeld-Rotenburg, Stölzinger Hills
 Lichtberg (465 m), county of Fulda, Kuppenrhön, Rhön
 Hohlstein (463 m), Hersfeld-Rotenburg, Richelsdorf Hills
 Butznickel (462.2 m), Hochtaunuskreis, Taunus
 Spitzhütte (462 m), Hersfeld-Rotenburg, Richelsdorf Hills
 Suterkopf (461.8 m), Limburg-Weilburg, Taunus
 Hahneberg (460.8 m), county of Kassel, Reinhardswald
 Sommerberg (460.8 m), Limburg-Weilburg, Taunus
 Koberg (460.5 m), Limburg-Weilburg, Taunus
 Bilstein (Langenberge) (460 m; hillfort), Schwalm-Eder-Kreis, Habichtswald Uplands
 Schönauer Küppel (459.0 m), Rheingau-Taunus-Kreis, Taunus
 Ölberg (457.8 m), county of Kassel, Söhre
 Schorn (456.8 m), county of Kassel, Söhre
 Rotestock (456 m), Hersfeld-Rotenburg, Richelsdorf Hills
 Schwalbenkopf (454.7 m), Hersfeld-Rotenburg, Seulingswald
 Schläferskopf (454.2 m), Wiesbaden, Taunus
 Junkernkopf (453 m), county of Kassel, Reinhardswald
 Escheberg (Landrücken) (452.3 m), Main-Kinzig-Kreis, Landrücken
 Hahnskopf (452 m), county of Kassel, Habichtswald Uplands
 Schlossberg (452 m), Werra-Meißner-Kreis, Ringgau
 Siebertsberg (449.1 m), Hersfeld-Rotenburg, Seulingswald
 Sengelsberg (449.0 m), Schwalm-Eder-Kreis, Habichtswald Uplands
 Escheberg (Malsburger Wald) (448.9 m), county of Kassel, Malsburger Wald
 Haukuppe (448 m), Hersfeld-Rotenburg, Knüll Hills
 Ziegenküppel (445.4 m), Werra-Meißner-Kreis, Stölzinger Hills
 Hornungskuppe (444 m), Hersfeld-Rotenburg, Seulingswald
 Knebelsrod (443.1 m), Waldeck-Frankenberg, Burgwald
 Badenstein (441.5 m), border county of Kassel & Schwalm-Eder-Kreis, Söhre
 Petershöhe (441 m), Schwalm-Eder-Kreis/Werra-Meißner-Kreis, Stölzinger Hills
 Erbelberg (440.0 m), Werra-Meißner-Kreis, Ringgau
 Burgberg (Baunatal) (439.6 m; hillfort), county of Kassel, Habichtswald Uplands
 Rabenstein (439.3 m), Waldeck-Frankenberg, Kellerwald
 Warpel (439.4 m), county of Kassel, Söhre
 Heiligenberg (439.0 m), Schwalm-Eder-Kreis, Melsung Uplands
 Ringelberg (436.4 m), Werra-Meißner-Kreis, Ringgau
 Iberg (434.0 m), Werra-Meißner-Kreis, Ringgau
 Brasselsberg (434.2 m), city of Kassel, Habichtswald Uplands
 Roteberg (434 m), Hersfeld-Rotenburg, Seulingswald
 Kalte Hainbuche (432.6 m), Schwalm-Eder-Kreis, Gilserbergen Heights
 Eisenberg (Dalwigksthal) (432.4 m), Waldeck-Frankenberg, Breite Struth
 Keseberg (431.2 m), Waldeck-Frankenberg, Kellerwald
 Langenberg (Reinhardswald) (430 m), county of Kassel, Reinhardswald
 Bromsberg (427.2 m), Schwalm-Eder-Kreis, Osthessisches Bergland
 Großer Staufenberg (427 m), county of Göttingen, Kaufungen Forest
 Kohlhau (425 m), Limburg-Weilburg, Westerwald
 Todtenhöhe (424 m), Waldeck-Frankenberg, Burgwald
 Hoher Buhlkopf (423 m), Schwalm-Eder-Kreis, Stölzinger Hills
 Flötschkopf (421 m), Wartburgkreis, Richelsdorf Hills
 Heukopf (421 m), Waldeck-Frankenberg, Burgwald
 Hangarstein (418.5 m), county of Kassel, Habichtswald Uplands
 Hühnerfeldberg (418.4 m), county of Göttingen, Kaufungen Forest
 ) (418 m), Hersfeld-Rotenburg, Stölzinger Hills
 Alter Turm (418 m), Hersfeld-Rotenburg, Stölzinger Hills
 Gernkopf (417 m), Hersfeld-Rotenburg, Knüll Hills
 Hammelsberg (415.6 m) Main-Kinzig-Kreis, Büdinger Wald
 Mäuseberg (415 m), Werra-Meißner-Kreis,
 Rammelsberg (415 m), county of, Stölzinger Hills
 Baunsberg (413.4 m), county of Kassel, Habichtswald Uplands
 Wasserberg (412 m), Waldeck-Frankenberg, Burgwald
 Ratzbusch (409 m), Hersfeld-Rotenburg, Richelsdorf Hills
 Störner (408 m), Hesse
 Tauschenberg (406.8 m), Marburg-Biedenkopf, Burgwald
 Ziegenküppel (Stolzhäuser Rücken) (405.8 m), Werra-Meißner-Kreis, Stolzhäuser Rücken, Stölzinger Hills
 Uhrenkopf (405 m), Waldeck-Frankenberg, Kellerwald
 Auerhansberg (403 m), Hersfeld-Rotenburg, Richelsdorf Hills
 Hesselkopf (403 m), Hersfeld-Rotenburg, Richelsdorf Hills
 Plessenberg (402 m), Hersfeld-Rotenburg, Seulingswald
 Stoppelberg (401.2 m), Lahn-Dill-Kreis, Taunus
 Schönelsberger Kopf (401 m), Waldeck-Frankenberg, Burgwald
 Pinnköppel (399.6 m), Hochtaunuskreis, Taunus
 Gerhardsberg (399 m), Marburg-Biedenkopf, Burgwald
 Hegeküppel (399 m), Hersfeld-Rotenburg, Richelsdorf Hills
 Heidenhäuschen (398 m), Limburg-Weilburg, Westerwald
 Dornburg (396 m), Limburg-Weilburg, Westerwald
 Eichkopf (Wernborn) (394.8 m), Hochtaunuskreis, Taunus
 Ahlberg (394.6 m), county of Kassel, Reinhardswald
 Heiligenberg (Felsberg) (393 m), Schwalm-Eder-Kreis, near Felsberg
 Heuberg (Hofgeismarer Stadtwald) (392.0 m), county of Kassel, Hofgeismarer Stadtwald
 Hohehardt (391 m), Marburg-Biedenkopf, Burgwald
 Schiefergrundskopf (388.6 m), Werra-Meißner-Kreis, Schlierbachswald
 Christenberg (387 m), Marburg-Biedenkopf, Burgwald
 Finsterkopf (386 m), Waldeck-Frankenberg, Burgwald
 Sattelkopf (384 m), Marburg-Biedenkopf, Burgwald
 Odenberg (381 m), Schwalm-Eder-Kreis, Gudensberger Kuppenschwelle
 Heiligenberg (Naumburg) (380.0 m), county of Kassel, Habichtswald Uplands
 Ortenberg (379.4 m), Marburg-Biedenkopf, Lahnberge
 Rödeser Berg (379.0 m), county of Kassel, Habichtswald Uplands
 Brodberg (376 m), Hersfeld-Rotenburg, Richelsdorf Hills
 Hoheberg (Züschen) (375.7 m), Schwalm-Eder-Kreis, Elberbergen Heights
 Hoher Rain (375.7 m), Werra-Meißner-Kreis, Schlierbachswald
 Großer Steinkopf (375 m), Hersfeld-Rotenburg, Seulingswald
 Hünerberg (375.0 m), Hochtaunuskreis, Taunus
 Igelsbett (373.8 m), county of Kassel, Habichtswald Uplands
 Hagenstein (373.3 m), Waldeck-Frankenberg, Kellerwald
 Ofenberg (372 m), county of Kassel, Habichtswald Uplands
 Vogelheerd (369.8 m), Marburg-Biedenkopf, Marburger Rücken
 Hühnerküppel (369.3 m), Limburg-Weilburg, Taunus
 Otzberg (367 m), county of Darmstadt-Dieburg, Odenwald
 Rauenstein (366.4 m), county of Kassel, Habichtswald Uplands
 Reichenberg (366 m), Hersfeld-Rotenburg, Richelsdorf Hills
 Hardtkopf (363.8 m), county of Kassel, Ostwaldecker Randsenken
 Amöneburg (363 m), Marburg-Biedenkopf, Amöneburg Basin
 Kammerberg (360.8 m), Schwalm-Eder-Kreis, Habichtswald Uplands
 Großer Hirschberg (358 m), Marburg-Biedenkopf, Burgwald
 Hauptkopf (357 m), Marburg-Biedenkopf, Burgwald
 Steinkopf near Hilwartshausen (353.2), county of Kassel, Reinhardswald
 Quillerkopf (Quiller; ca. 345 m), Schwalm-Eder-Kreis, near Körle
 Stöckeberg (344.8 m), county of Kassel, Waldeck Forest, Langer Wald
 Gellenberg (340 m), Hersfeld-Rotenburg, Seulingswald
 Söhler (338 m), Marburg-Biedenkopf, Burgwald
 Hundsburg (334.9 m), Schwalm-Eder-Kreis, Kellerwald
 Hoheberg (Reptich) (333.2 m), Schwalm-Eder-Kreis, Gilserbergen Heights
 Großer Wachenkopf (333.1 m), Schwalm-Eder-Kreis, Habichtswald Uplands
 Kleiner Wachenkopf (327 m), Schwalm-Eder-Kreis, Habichtswald Uplands
 Johanneskirchenkopf (332 m), Schwalm-Eder-Kreis, Alter Wald
 Kainsberg (324 m), Waldeck-Frankenberg, Burgwald
 Lamsberg (322 m), Schwalm-Eder-Kreis, Gudensberger Kuppenschwelle
 Ziegenrück (318.2 m), county of Kassel, Habichtswald Uplands
 Graner Berg (315.0 m), county of Kassel, Wolfhager Hügelland
 Firnskuppe (313.9 m), city of Kassel, Habichtswald Uplands
 Mensfelder Kopf (313.7 m), Limburg-Weilburg, Taunus
 Kopfsteine (310 m), county of Kassel, Habichtswald Uplands
 Nenkel (307.1 m), Schwalm-Eder-Kreis, Gudensberger Kuppenschwelle
 Breuberg (306 m), Odenwaldkreis, Odenwald
 Wartberg (306.0 m), Schwalm-Eder-Kreis, Fritzlar Börde
 Schloßberg (305.8 m), Schwalm-Eder-Kreis, Gudensberger Kuppenschwelle
 Scharfenstein (304 m), Schwalm-Eder-Kreis, Gudensberger Kuppenschwelle
 Junkerskopf (284.2 m), Schwalm-Eder-Kreis, Habichtswald Uplands
 Holzberg (280 m), Hochtaunuskreis, Taunus
 Schützeberg (277.2 m), county of Kassel, Habichtswald Uplands
 Büraberg (275 m), Schwalm-Eder-Kreis, Hessewald
 Steinkopf near Wülmersen (271.1), county of Kassel, Reinhardswald
 Mader Stein (265 m), Schwalm-Eder-Kreis, Gudensberger Kuppenschwelle
 Hahn (255.8 m), Schwalm-Eder-Kreis, Kassel Basin
 Eckerich (254 m), Schwalm-Eder-Kreis, Elberbergen Heights
 Steinkopf in the Fulda Valley (250), county of Kassel, Reinhardswald
 Neroberg (245.0 m), Wiesbaden, Taunus
 Mainzer Berg (227 m), Dieburg
 Moosberg (185.0), county of Kassel, Reinhardswald
 Oberwaldberg (145 m), Hesse

See also 
 List of the mountain and hill ranges in Germany
 List of the highest mountains of Germany
 List of the highest mountains of the German states

Mountains in Hesse

Hesse